Gymnopilus parvisquamulosus is a species of mushroom-forming fungus in the family Hymenogastraceae.

Description

Habitat and distribution
Gymnopilus parvisquamulosus grows in groups on conifer logs. It has been found in California and Maine, between June and August.

See also

List of Gymnopilus species

References

parvisquamulosus
Fungi of North America
Fungi described in 1969
Taxa named by Lexemuel Ray Hesler